Leonid Vasilyevich Baratov (April 1 (O.S. March 20), 1895, Moscow – July 22, 1964, Moscow) was a Soviet opera director and People's Artist of the RSFSR (1958). 

Leonid Baratov was awarded Stalin Prizes on several occasions (1943, 1949, 1950, 1951, 1952), three orders, and numerous medals.

Biography
Leonid Baratov was born on 1 April 1895 in Moscow. He studied at the law faculty of Moscow University.

References

External links

 Leonid Baratov. Mariinsky 
 Leonid Baratov. Bolshoy 

1895 births
1964 deaths
People's Artists of the RSFSR
Stalin Prize winners
Recipients of the Order of the Red Banner of Labour
Russian opera directors
Burials at Novodevichy Cemetery